Adventures / Pity Sex is a split EP between the American rock bands Adventures and Pity Sex, released on October 7, 2014, through Run for Cover Records. It features one original track and one cover by each band.

Track listing

Personnel
Adventures
 Dominic Landolina – guitar
 Jami Morgan – drums
 Joe Goldman – vocals, bass
 Kimi Hanauer – keyboard
 Reba Meyers – vocals, guitar

Pity Sex
 Sean St. Charles – drums
 Brennan Greaves – guitar, vocals
 Brandan Pierce – bass
 Britty Drake – guitar, vocals

References

2014 EPs
Split EPs
Adventures (band) albums
Pity Sex albums
Run for Cover Records EPs